Tea Grubišić (born December 3, 1985) is a Croatian female handballer playing in the Turkish Women's Handball Super League for Ardeşen GSK and the Croatian national team. The -tall sportswoman plays in the left wing position.

She played in her country for RK Podravka Koprivnica (2004–2005), RK Lokomotiva Zagreb (2005–2011 and 2013–2015) and ZRK Samobor (2012–2013) before she transferred to the German team SG BBM Bietigheim. Grubišić moved the next season to Turkey to play for the Rize-based team Ardeşen GSK in the Women's Super League.

References

1985 births
Handball players from Zagreb
Croatian female handball players
Croatian expatriate sportspeople in Germany
Expatriate sportspeople in Germany
Croatian expatriate sportspeople in Turkey
Expatriate handball players in Turkey
Ardeşen GSK players
Living people
21st-century Croatian women